Thompson Buchanan (June 21, 1877 - October 15, 1937) was an American writer.  While a journalist he began writing novels, and then turned to plays, with 1909's A Woman's Way starring Grace George being his first hit.  He began writing for movies in 1916, and also wrote radio sketches.

Buchanan was married twice.  First to Katharine Winterbotham from 1915-1927, and then actress Joan Lowell from 1927-1929.

Buchanan died in Louisville, Kentucky on October 15, 1937, suffering a heart attack during a trip to visit family.

Selected bibliography
 The Castle Comedy (1904 novel)
 Judith Triumphant (1905 novel)
 The Intruder (1908 play)
 A Woman's Way (1909 play)
 The Cub (1910 play)
 The Rack (1911 play)
 Life (1914 play)
 Civilian Clothes (1919 play)
 The Sporting Thing To Do (1922 play)

References

External links
 
 
 
 

1877 births
1937 deaths
Sewanee: The University of the South alumni
20th-century American novelists
20th-century American dramatists and playwrights